Lou Cioffi is a retired American soccer goalkeeper who played professionally in the North American Soccer League, Major Indoor Soccer League and third American Soccer League.

Cioffi transferred to the University of Central Florida where he played on the men's soccer team in 1978 and 1979.  In February 1980, Cioffi was cut by the Atlanta Chiefs during the preseason training camp.  In May 1980, the Chiefs signed Cioffi as a free agent after Victor Nogueira was injured.  He then played the 1980-1981 NASL Indoor season with the Chiefs.  He spent one more outdoor season with the Chiefs before moving to the New Jersey Rockets of the Major Indoor Soccer League in the fall of 1981.  In 1986, he returned to Florida to complete his bachelor's degree.  In addition to attending school, he played for the independent Orlando Lions.  In 1987, he played for the Orlando Rockets.  In 1989, he returned to the Lions, now playing in the third American Soccer League.

References

External links
NASL/MISL stats

1957 births
Sportspeople from the Bronx
Soccer players from New York City
American soccer players
American Soccer League (1988–89) players
Atlanta Chiefs players
Chicago Sting (MISL) players
Cleveland Force (original MISL) players
Major Indoor Soccer League (1978–1992) players
North American Soccer League (1968–1984) indoor players
New Jersey Rockets (MISL) players
North American Soccer League (1968–1984) players
Orlando Lions players
UCF Knights men's soccer players
Living people
Association football goalkeepers